Zarghona Walizada is an Afghan businesswoman, who owns Afghanistan's largest transport company. Her company, Tac Taz, employs several hundreds of people, has its headquarters in Kabul and several branch offices throughout the country. Zarghona Walizada set up Tac Taz alone, in spite of threats from her competition, and despite attacks on the trucks of her company by insurgents and criminals – attacks that make cargo transportation one of the most dangerous businesses in Afghanistan. In this extremely tough environment, Zarghona Walizada has not only shown great courage – she has also proved that an Afghan woman can do better than her male competitors.

Zarghuna Walizada's TAC TAZ International was established in 1990. With an annual turnover of US$35 million, she employs 400 people. Into construction and freighting, she sought joint ventures, marketing and management support.

Further reading
Afghan women lead way in land of opportunity - New Straits Times Column

References

Afghan businesspeople
Living people
Year of birth missing (living people)